The following is a list of churches in Cornwall.

Map of medieval parish churches

Active churches

The following civil parishes have no active churches: Paul, St Martin-by-Looe, St Stephens by Launceston Rural, and the unparished area of Wolf Rock.

The unitary authority has an estimated 627 churches for 553,700 people, a ratio of one church to every 883 people.

Defunct churches

References

churches
Christianity in Cornwall
Lists of churches in England